Póvoa Semanário is one of the three main local newspapers of Póvoa de Varzim, Portugal.

Its current editor-in-chief is Catarina Pessanha.

Newspapers published in Portugal
Mass media in Póvoa de Varzim